Microlophichthys is a genus of dreamers.

Species
There are currently two recognized species in this genus:.
 Microlophichthys andracanthus Bertelsen, 1951
 Microlophichthys microlophus Regan, 1925 (Short-rod anglerfish)

References

Oneirodidae
Marine fish genera
Taxa named by Charles Tate Regan
Taxa named by Ethelwynn Trewavas